Conrad Fulke Thomond O'Brien-ffrench, 2nd Marquis de Castelthomond (19 November 1893 – 23 October 1986) was a distinguished British Secret Intelligence Officer, Captain in the Tipperary Rangers of the Royal Irish Regiment and 16th The Queen's Lancers in World War I, and Mountie for the Royal North-West Mounted Police. He was also an accomplished artist, linguist, mountaineer, skier, and author.

Early life and education

Conrad Fulke Thomond O'Brien-ffrench was born in London, England, the second son of Henry Albert De Vreque O'Brien-ffrench, 1st Marquis de Castelthomond, and his wife Winifred née Thursby, heiress and daughter of Major James Legh Thursby, of Ormerod House Lancashire.

He and his elder brother Rollo (Rollo Adrien Vladimir Thursby Marie Altieri O'Brien-ffrench) spent their early childhood in Italy at Villa Torlonia (Frascati) in the Alban Hills, east of Rome, and then at Piazza dell'Indipendenza in Florence, where they received private tutoring in English, French and Italian. Returning to England, Conrad joined Rollo at the Wick, a preparatory school at Hove in Sussex. After Rollo left the Wick, Conrad completed his preparatory schooling at St. Aubyns School in Rottingdean, and then attended Bradley Court Agricultural College in the Forest of Dean, where he developed his lifelong interest in horsemanship, fox hunting and other country pursuits, and became a junior member of the Ledbury Hunt. During these years his other siblings, Yvonne (Yvonne Castelthomond O'Brien-ffrench) and Alexis (Alexis Evelyn Henry O'Brien-ffrench), were born.

Royal North-West Mounted Police

When he was 16, Conrad's life took an abrupt turn when Rollo died in an accident playing football. Conrad left school at this time to study farming in the Evesham Valley, and while there he met a Justice of the Peace from Buffalo Lake Ranch in Saskatchewan, who told him of life on the wild frontier and of the Royal North-West Mounted Police. In April 1910, at age 17, Conrad sailed on the Empress of Britain for Quebec and continued west to join the Royal North-West Mounted Police in Saskatchewan.

After basic training Conrad was posted to Cypress Hills, a remote and untamed area. He was later posted to Willow Creek and then Battle Creek, but mid-1912 received word that his mother was dying from cancer. He purchased his release and returned to Esher in Surrey to be by her side. She died the following summer.

During this time Conrad and friends took weekend trips to the Brooklands race track, where he was introduced to motor racing. Subsequently he purchased a 1909 Mercedes Simplex and developed a taste for fast cars.

Military service

Battle of Mons
Following his mother's death, Conrad travelled to his ancestral homeland in Ireland and joined The Tipperary Militia, a special reserve unit of the Royal Irish Regiment. In August 1914 he was promoted to captain and engaged in the Battle of Mons with his regiment as part of the British Expeditionary Force. On the first day of battle he was severely wounded, captured and taken prisoner. He was held first at Torgau, a Bismarckian fortress, and then at Burg de Magdeburg POW camp.

After numerous failed escape attempts, he was transferred to what was considered an escape-proof camp at Augustabad. Here Conrad began an exchange of letters with his friend Cathleen Mann, and through the use of invisible ink, transmitted details of troop movements and other strategic information gathered from incoming prisoners. One communication included information about a prototype German Bomber that he obtained from a captured British pilot. Her job as secretary to Stewart Menzies of British counterintelligence, allowed a speedy relay of information through Menzies to Field Marshal Douglas Haig. Attempts were made to extract Conrad and the pilot to London, but these failed and Conrad remained in Augustabad.

MI6
Following World War I, Conrad was summoned to Whitehall in December 1918 to meet then Colonel Stewart Menzies, who recruited Conrad into MI6. At the time, Menzies reported to Captain Mansfield Smith-Cumming, the first head of the British Secret Service, who was called "C", a designation that remains to the present day. He was posted to the British Legation in Stockholm as Assistant Military Attaché under the command of Major Dymoke Scale. While a POW, Conrad had learned fluent Russian, and was now tasked with gathering information from Russian refugees fleeing the aftermath of the 1917 revolution.

In 1920, Conrad was assigned to escort Russian diplomat Leonid Krasin through countries hostile to the new Communist government to meet with Prime Minister Lloyd George in London for secret talks about the restoration of trade with the West. Dispatches from Lord Acton, British Minister Plenipotentiary to the newly independent Finland, confirmed arrangements for a special train to meet the delegation and under heavy guard they traveled to Turku, Finland, then Sweden to reunite with Krasin's family, en route for England. This event, the first face-to-face meeting between Russian Communist leadership and the outside world, led to the Anglo-Soviet Trade Agreement of March 1921.

Subsequently, the postwar depression and easing Soviet-British relations caused cutbacks to the Secret Service, and Conrad resigned from the service and returned to England.

India
 
Upon his return, Conrad was assigned as an Aide-de-camp to one of the British Governors for the upcoming Royal tour of India. Edward VIII, then the Prince of Wales, arrived in India on 21 December 1921, and stayed until April 1922. During this time the Indian National Congress of Mohandas Karamchand Gandhi and Jawaharlal Nehru was in full swing, and the Royal tour was dogged by passive demonstrations and riots. The heavy handed response of the British to this resistance played a part in the end of the British Raj.

In February 1922, Conrad witnessed a meeting requested by the Viceroy of India, Lord Reading (Rufus Isaacs, 1st Marquess of Reading), with the Prince to discuss the possible arrest of Mohandas K. Gandhi. On 1 February 1922, Gandhi had written a letter to the Viceroy informing him of the Bardoli district's decision to commence mass civil disobedience and non-payment of taxes, unless the Viceroy declared a policy of non-interference with non-violent activities.

On 4 February 1922, upon learning that the sub inspector of Chauri Chaura police station assaulted Congress volunteers at Mundera Bazar, an angry mob gathered at the station, demanding explanation from the guilty official. While the crowd marched on, shouting anti-government slogans, police fired warning shots agitating the crowds further. In response the crowd began throwing stones at the police, who were then ordered to open fire, killing three and wounding several others. The police retreated, some believe due to lack of ammunition while others attribute it to fear of the angry and courageous crowd. Chaos ensued and the heavily outnumbered police returned to the shelter of Thana (City Hall). The enraged crowd challenged the police to come out of their den, and on paying no heed, took revenge by setting the Thana on fire, killing 22 officers (including the station officer) who were trapped inside.

Gandhi did not support the violent actions, and consequently suspended the Non-cooperation movement at its peak. British officials hoped to suppress the civil disobedience by arresting Gandhi, and on 10 March 1922, Lord Reading ordered Gandhi's arrest. The initial discussion that Conrad witnessed was now a reality, Gandhi had been arrested, tried and jailed, but the results were not as the British intended. Conrad experienced firsthand the transformative influence of one man as he peacefully expressed true character, and soon the control of the British Raj gave way to India's leadership.

Mountaineering 
During Conrad's stay in India, he was introduced to mountaineering and the Himalayas. One of his more dangerous climbs was near Srinagar in the Vale of Kashmir. While climbing the Skoro La Pass, a mountain downpour created dangerous conditions, transforming the rocky cliff his party was ascending into an icy waterfall. A landslide, freezing conditions and dwindling light forced the team to rapidly forge an alternative route. Conrad led the team to safety, and ultimately to the summit.

Conrad explored the Himalayas, Austrian Alps and other world ranges, meeting Sir Francis Younghusband, Frank Smythe, Sir John Hunt and Sir Edmund Hillary. In The May Mountaineer, Conrad describes skiing adventures among the towering peaks and glaciers of the Austrian Alps. When living in Banff, he often rock-climbed and ski'd in the Lake and Fairhome ranges. Elected to the Alpine Club in 1933, Conrad became a lifelong member. The following are some of Conrad's earlier climbs, documented upon his nomination to the Alpine Club in London, England.

Expeditions

Art 
Returning to England and to civilian life, Conrad explored a career in the arts. Years earlier, a hunt secretary had commissioned Conrad to paint a series of hunting scenes that were subsequently published in a book. Encouraged by this, Conrad studied art at the Slade School of Fine Art in London under Professor Henry Tonks (1926–27), at the Byam Shaw School of Art under Ernest Jackson (1928–29), and at Andre Lhote's Academy in Montparnasse, Paris (1930–32). Student friends included Simon Elwes, Henri Cartier-Bresson, Guy Arnoux and Elena Mumm Thornton Wilson. Conrad worked out of his studio in the Parc Monsouri district and gained an increasing reputation for his portraits.

Upon completion of his studies, Conrad travelled to Jamaica with his father, painting and preparing for an exhibition at the Claridge Gallery in London. The paintings and drawings in the exhibition included Jamaican scenes, as well as portraits of H.R.H. The Duchess of Pistoia, H.S.H. The Duchess d'Arenberg, Il Duca de La Tour Corio and Il Marchese di Castlethomond.

Exhibitions and collections 
Conrad had exhibitions in galleries and museums in Europe, Jamaica, Canada and the United States, including the following:

 The Claridge Gallery, "Conrad ffrench", London, England, 16–30 October 1930
 The Grand Salon, Group Exhibit, Paris, France, 1930's
 Art Collection of Whyte Museum of the Canadian Rockies
 Loveland Museum and Gallery, "Artistry in Living- The Life of Conrad O'Brien-ffrench", Loveland, Colorado, U.S. 1 August – 19 September 1987.
 Monivea Artisan Garden Gallery, Exhibit of Paintings by Conrad O'Brien-ffrench, Salt Spring Island, British Columbia, Canada. ongoing exhibit

Teaching
Conrad taught art at the Banff School of Fine Arts, Banff, Alberta, from 1948; from 1955 he was President of Rim Rock School of Fine Art, Loveland, Colorado; and, from 1975, Vice President of Water Wheel Gallery, Estes Park, Colorado.

Marriage and family
On 16 June 1931 Conrad married Maud Astrid, the youngest daughter of Col. Bo Tarras-Wahlberg, of Stockholm, A.D.C. to King Gustav V of Sweden. They were married in Paris, honeymooned in London and Austria, and then settled in Kitzbühel, Austria, where Conrad continued his work with the British Secret Service. The marriage produced a daughter, Christina Laetitia, and was dissolved in 1934. Conrad remarried on 1 May 1945, in London, England, to Rosalie Isabelle Baker, daughter of Ralph George Baker. They moved to Canada (see Fairholme Ranch) and had two sons, Rollo and John.

Return to Secret Service

Conrad had become a personal friend of Stewart Menzies, who later (in 1939) was named head of the British Secret Service. He persuaded Conrad to rejoin the Secret Service (now as Agent Z3), and provided him with the cover of businessman. The newly formed Secret Intelligence Service (SIS) network "Z" was taking shape under a variety of business covers, and Conrad established Tyrolese Tours offering package tours to Austria and Southern Germany. He based himself in Kitzbühel and proceeded to establish a spy network stretching from Austria deep into Southern Germany. While in Kitzbühel, Conrad met Peter Fleming and Ian Fleming, and they often crossed paths at homes of mutual friends, at bars, on the ski slopes or at the warm-water lake, the Schwarzsee. Conrad's style, athletic endeavours, personal adventures and experience in espionage may have provided Ian Fleming with some of his inspirations for James Bond. He was also in attendance to Edward VIII and Wallis Simpson, who used Kitzbühel as their first home after the abdication crisis of 1936.

Conrad provided intelligence on Nazi occultism and the build up of German forces in preparation for World War II. On Friday, 11 March 1938, Conrad received a message from an Austrian living near the Austrian/German border, reporting that German forces were advancing from Bad Tölz and Rosenheim towards the Austrian border. The timeliness of this information is critical to political and military manoeuvres. Knowing this, Conrad used the most expedient method available to transmit the message, phoning the report directly to London, even though it exposed his cover. He was told that this was the first news received from Allied capitals reporting the advance. Conrad continued to receive confirmations of the advance throughout the day. Through his local contacts he was able to warn residents, giving many in danger time to quickly pack and flee—saving lives. The ease of travel quickly changed, and by the next morning Gestapo officials were ripping soles from passengers' shoes in search of money and incriminating documents. At 9 a.m., Saturday morning, 12 March, a large force of German troops entered Kitzbühel, with another at Mittenwald to occupy Innsbruck and the country west as far as the Arlberg Pass.

Himmler's Gestapo, in 1940, prepared for Nazi Germany's invasion of Britain in World War II by compiling a list of more than 2,300 names of the most-wanted Britons in The Black Book (Sonderfahndungsliste G.B.). It includes the name of French, Marquis de Castelchomond (sic), O'Brien with the notation "brit. Agent, Kapitän." The 112th entry continues with "vermutl. England, RSHA IV E4 Stapoleit München." The Reich Main Security Office, RSHA, combined the SS Intelligence Service (the SD), Secret State Police (Gestapo), Criminal Police (Kripo) and Foreign Intelligence Service into an enormous organization, armed with the data and resources to commit mass murders. The RSHA coding system reveals the last of the entry, with "IV E4" meaning "Counter-Intelligence in Scandinavia." Conrad's cover as a spy was compromised after the Austrian Anschluss of 1938, and he retired from the intelligence services soon after.

During the war O'Brien-ffrench also served as Imperial censor in Trinidad.

Fairholme Ranch
Conrad married Rosalie Isabelle Baker, daughter of Ralph George Baker, on 1 May 1945, in London, England.  After World War II Conrad and his wife moved to British Columbia, and purchased waterfront property on Maple Bay, Vancouver Island. Soon they moved again to "Fairholme Ranch," a property located five miles east of Banff, Alberta and within Banff National Park's boundaries. Conrad designed and helped to build a large 14-room lodge and a cottage at Fairholme, where he and Rosie raised their sons, Rollo and John. Conrad settled down to a new life of raising horses and teaching at The Banff School of Fine Arts. Founded in 1933 by Alberta University as a school of theatrical arts, The Banff School of Fine Arts expanded its curriculum and in 1948 Conrad joined the faculty to teach visual arts.

In 1958, HRH Princess Margaret, Countess of Snowdon took up residence at Fairholme Ranch during her Canadian visit of that year. It provided splendid views of Princess Margaret Mountain named in honour of her visit.

"On 28 July the Princess drove from the ranch house where she was staying, a few miles outside of Banff, to visit the Banff School of Fine Arts, where she saw students from many parts of the Commonwealth at work."

The historic lodge was later carefully disassembled, moved and rebuilt just outside Stony Plain (near Edmonton, Alberta).

Later years
Conrad lived in West Vancouver and eventually retired to his chalet in Loveland, Colorado. He taught and exhibited art, living out his years painting and lecturing art, philosophy and theology.

Biography

Delicate Mission, Autobiography of a Secret Agent is in many collections, including:
 The Imperial War Museum
 The British Library
 Library and Archives of Canada
 White Museum of the Canadian Rockies
 The Alpine Club Library

Interviews

See also
Ian Fleming
Inspirations for James Bond

References

External links
Artwork of Conrad O'Brien-ffrench at Monivea Artisan Garden Gallery
Ffrench Family Association: ffrenches of Monivea Castle
History of the Banff Centre (The Banff School of Fine Arts)

1893 births
1986 deaths
World War I spies for the United Kingdom
Royal Irish Regiment (1684–1922) officers
British Army personnel of World War I
Royal Canadian Mounted Police officers
World War I prisoners of war held by Germany
Military personnel from London
Secret Intelligence Service personnel
British World War I prisoners of war
Alumni of the Byam Shaw School of Art
British mountain climbers